Abdullah Al Thani may refer to:

In Libya
Abdullah al-Thani (born 1954), House of Representatives prime minister of Libya

In Qatar
Abdullah bin Ali Al Thani, Qatari royal
Abdullah bin Jassim Al Thani (1880–1948), ruler of Qatar 1913–1940
Abdullah bin Khalid Al Thani, Qatari politician
Abdullah bin Khalifa Al Thani (born 1959), Qatari politician
Abdullah bin Nasser bin Abdullah Al Ahmed Al Thani (born 1969), Qatari businessman
Abdullah bin Nasser bin Khalifa Al Thani (born 1965), Qatari royal and politician
Abdullah bin Mohammed bin Saud Al Thani, Qatari royal